Rutan & Tucker, LLP is a law firm based in Irvine, California that is organized into more than 30 legal practice areas in seven groups: Litigation and Trial, Corporate and Tax, Employment, Government and Regulatory, Intellectual Property, Land Use and Entitlement and Real Estate. In addition to other practices, it is known for specializing in advice to local governments. 

The company was founded in 1940 by A.W. Rutan and today is the largest full-service law firm headquartered in Orange County, California with offices in Palo Alto and San Francisco. The company has over 150 attorneys.

References

Companies based in Costa Mesa, California
Law firms based in California
1940 establishments in California